The Federal Republic of Somalia’s special presidential envoy for drought climate is a position in the Executive Office of the President of the Somalia with authority over energy policy and climate policy within the executive branch. It is currently held by Abdirahman Abdishakur Warsame, who is the inaugural envoy.

Reference 

Politics of Somalia

 climate change